Lake Waubesa is one of the four major lakes in Dane County, Wisconsin that surround the city of Madison.

In 2013, the Wisconsin state record Yellow bass was caught in Lake Waubesa.

See also
Lake Mendota
Lake Monona
Lake Wingra
Lake Kegonsa

Notes

Lakes of Dane County, Wisconsin
Bodies of water of Madison, Wisconsin